Mort the Chicken is a platform game developed by AndNow and published by Crave Entertainment. It was released in North America on November 30, 2000 for the PlayStation and later released in Europe on January 19, 2001.

Plot
In a universe where chickens are the dominant species, Mort the Chicken stars in his own television show. However, in an alternate universe, cube-like creatures called The Boolyon are spying on them. Their leader, General Cubicles, notices that the chickens have stacks of hay, but mistakes them for kidnapped citizens of their universe; in retaliation, he launches an invasion of the chickens' universe through a well, and the Boolyon kidnap the baby chicks, scattering them across the Boolyon's universe. Mort, being the only one brave enough to stop the cubes, jumps down the well and starts his adventure to save the baby chicks.

Gameplay

Mort the Chicken is a relatively straightforward platformer. The player controls Mort as he explores his universe, rescuing baby chicks and killing cubes. Mort can destroy the cubes using the comb on his head, which can be used as a whip. Some cubes cannot be killed, and every time Mort takes a hit, the cubes steal a chick from Mort and imprison it. Mort's health bar is shown by two stalks of corn, and when Mort loses health, part of the corn disappears. Each level has up to 10 chicks to rescue. Mort can also gain power-ups. These power-ups include making him jump higher, become giant, attract chicks, extend his neck-whip attack, or have chicks attack enemies. Eggs and chicken food are scattered across the levels, and Mort can peck at these with his beak. Eggs give Mort power-ups and chicken food restores health.

Reception

Mort the Chicken received unfavorable reviews according to the review aggregation website GameRankings.

Legacy
Mort is featured in the 2023 game Pizza Tower as a power-up in the stage "Fun Farm", allowing the player to double jump and attack enemies. Ed Annunziata, the creator of the character, gave permission for the character to be used in the game.

References

External links

2000 video games
PlayStation (console) games
PlayStation (console)-only games
Platform games
Fictional chickens
Video games about birds
Video games developed in Hungary
Video games developed in the United States
3D platform games